This list contains the Belgian television channels that are broadcast either terrestrially (DVB-T), via cable (Telenet, VOO and Numericable) or phone lines (Proximus), or via satellite (TV Vlaanderen and Télésat).

See also 
 Television in Belgium

Belgium
Television in Belgium
Stations